Abdus Sawar is a Jatiya Party (Ershad) politician and the former Member of Parliament of Jhenaidah-4.

Career
Sawar was elected to parliament from Jhenaidah-4 as a Jatiya Party candidate in 1986.

References

Jatiya Party politicians
Living people
3rd Jatiya Sangsad members
Year of birth missing (living people)